The Beverly Hilton is a hotel located on an  property at the intersection of Wilshire and Santa Monica boulevards in Beverly Hills, California. The Beverly Hilton has hosted many awards shows, charity benefits, and entertainment and motion picture industry events, and is particularly known as the venue of the annual Golden Globe Awards ceremony.

History
Conrad Hilton opened the Beverly Hilton in 1955. American architect Welton Becket designed the hotel as a showpiece with 582 rooms.

Since 1961, the hotel's International Ballroom has hosted the Golden Globe Awards ceremony, presented annually by the Hollywood Foreign Press Association.

In 1975, 50% of the property was sold to Prudential Insurance Company forming a partnership with the Hilton Hotels Corporation. The partnership sold the hotel to entertainer and businessman Merv Griffin for $100.2 million in December 1987.

The Beverly Hilton had completed a $35 million renovation prior to Griffin's purchase. The hotel was Griffin's second choice, as he had expressed an interest in buying the 260-room Beverly Hills Hotel, which had recently been sold to Sultan Hassanal Bolkiah of Brunei for $200 million by a group headed by Denver oilman Marvin Davis.

Griffin owned the hotel from 1987 to 2003, during which time its reputation faded as maintenance was deferred and competition increased. In 2003, Griffin sold the Beverly Hilton for $130 million to Beny Alagem, co-founder of Packard Bell Electronics, through his company Oasis West Realty. Commemorating its 50th anniversary, an ambitious $80 million renovation by architecture firm Gensler began in conjunction with Hilton Hotels, which has managed the property since it opened.

The renovation reduced the number of rooms to 570, which feature 42-inch plasma high-definition televisions and Bose Wave radios. The rooms also have ample work spaces, reflecting a change at the hotel, which long catered mostly to leisure travelers, into a property where business travelers constitute 80 percent of the clientele. The meeting spaces and the International Ballroom—where the Golden Globes ceremony is held—were also renovated.

On February 11, 2012, singer Whitney Houston died in Suite 434 after accidentally drowning in the bathtub. The room number was retired and the room repurposed.

Beverly Hills Waldorf Astoria and Measure H
In April 2006, owners unveiled plans for a $500-million expansion to the Beverly Hilton property. The plans require an amendment to the Beverly Hills general plan's three-story height limit in order to build two 13-story condominium towers and a 15-story condo hotel, where rooms would be rented to guests when their owners are away. One intent of the owner's plan was "to position the upgraded hotel as a less-expensive 4½-star alternative to nearby five-star rivals such as the Peninsula."

Two new three-story buildings on Wilshire Boulevard would house 96 guest rooms and shops. The Beverly Hilton will be renovated into a smaller, 402-room hotel, renamed the Beverly Hilton Oasis. A 120-room Waldorf-Astoria Beverly Hills hotel, designed by Gensler with interiors by Pierre-Yves Rochon, will be included in the project. The Waldorf-Astoria Beverly Hills was the first new hotel for the brand on the West Coast. The Beverly Hilton and the Waldorf-Astoria are separate premises, with both operated and managed by Hilton Hotels Corporation.

The Beverly Hills City Council approved the $500 million project by a 3–2 vote. Local resident opponents led by a group called Citizens Right to Decide Committee gathered enough signatures to place the referendum (Measure H) on November 4, 2008, ballot with the argument that "It's Just Too Big." Measure H authorized the Beverly Hills City Council to amend the city's general plan to allow a "luxury hotel, condominiums and open space" to be built on the site of the Beverly Hilton Hotel. Resolution No. 08-R-12601, “Resolution of the Council of the City of Beverly Hills amending the General Plan to enable the revitalization of the Beverly Hilton Hotel site with a new Luxury Hotel, Condominiums, and Open Space,” Los Angeles County election officials reported a week after the vote that local Measure H was losing by 68 votes, with provisional ballots yet to be counted. On December 2, 2008, Proposal H passed by 129 votes with over 15,000 cast.

In April 2014, Oasis West Realty, owner of The Beverly Hilton and Hilton Worldwide announced that Waldorf Astoria Beverly Hills will be built at the intersection of Santa Monica and Wilshire Boulevards, adjacent to the hotel. The 12-story, 170-room Waldorf Astoria Beverly Hills was designed by architecture firm Gensler with interior designer by Pierre-Yves Rochon. The hotel also features a monumental stainless steel sculpture titled 'SWAY' which was designed and fabricated by sculptor Nick Petronzio. Additionally, the Waldorf Astoria has upscale eateries as well as stores including jeweler Graff Diamonds, a Waldorf Astoria Spa meeting space, and a ballroom that can hold up to 200 people. The property opened in 2017.

Beverly Hills Measure HH 
Measure HH (or the Hilton Condominium Tower initiative) was a November 2016 ballot initiative to allow Oasis West Realty to build a 37-story condominium tower on the Beverly Hilton site. The initiative was rejected by Beverly Hills voters, with nearly 56% voting no.

Notable events
Golden Globe Awards since 1961
Gracie Awards presented by the Alliance for Women in Media Foundation, since 1975
Clive Davis Pre-Grammy Party
Richard Nixon's "last press conference", in which he lashed out at the media following his defeat in the 1962 California governor's race.
U.S. Presidential candidate and Senator John Edwards was videotaped visiting Rielle Hunter, during his 2008 extramarital affair scandal.
USA Swimming's Golden Goggle Awards in 2007 and 2009
Singer Whitney Houston died at the hotel on February 11, 2012, after accidentally drowning while in the bathtub of her suite.

See also

 Hilton Worldwide

References

External links
The Beverly Hilton website

1950s architecture in the United States
Hotels in Beverly Hills, California
Golden Globe Awards
Culture of Hollywood, Los Angeles
Hotels established in 1955
Hotel buildings completed in 1955
Hilton Hotels & Resorts hotels
Welton Becket buildings
Wilshire Boulevard
Skyscraper hotels in California
Skyscrapers in California
1955 establishments in California
Grammy Award venues